Highway 684 is the name given to two different highways in the Canadian province of Saskatchewan.

It begins near Waseca at Highway 16 and it ends at Highway 3.

Long known as Dalmeny Road, in 2012 the section of Highway 684 within Saskatoon's city limits was renamed Neault Road.

The city of Saskatoon and the province plan to ultimately construct an interchange at the junction of Highway 684 and Highway 14 as part of the Blairmore Suburban Centre development and, in particular, the buildout of the Kensington neighbourhood. Concept maps indicate plans to reroute Highway 684 to link with the Yellowhead Highway at a junction with Marquis Road in north Saskatoon.

Intersections from south to north on the north-western highway

Intersections from south to north on the south-eastern highway

See also 
Roads in Saskatchewan
Transportation in Saskatchewan

References 

684